Eural may refer to:
 Eural Trans Gas, a Hungarian energy company
 Eural, a Belgian bank, subsidiary of Dexia

See also 
 Ural (disambiguation)